Ulvaceae is a widely distributed family of thin green algae having either a flat or a hollow tubular thallus, reproducing by the conjugation of planogametes or of zoospores, and being classed among the Ulotrichales or now more commonly placed in the order Ulvales.

Genera in the family Ulvaceae
 Enteromorpha
 Enteronia
 Gemina
 Letterstedtia
 Lobata
 Ochlochaete
 Percursaria
 Phycoseris
 Ruthnielsenia
 Solenia
 Ulva
 Ulvaria
 Umbraulva

References

 
Ulvophyceae families